Disciplined Breakdown is the third studio album by American post-grunge band Collective Soul. It was first released on March 11, 1997. The album was recorded during a difficult time in the band's career, when they were going through a long lawsuit with their former management, and they also recorded the album in a cabin-like studio due to lack of money.

Although not as successful as their first two albums, Disciplined Breakdown did earn Collective Soul a million-selling album (platinum status) in the US, and charted at #16 on the top 200 Album Chart. Two songs also charted on the US Billboard Hot 100: "Precious Declaration" (US #65), also #1 on the Mainstream Rock Tracks for four weeks; and "Listen" (US #72), also #1 on the Mainstream Rock Tracks for five weeks.

In 1996, Atlantic Records manufactured and released a limited quantity of vinyl versions of the album before the album's full release several months later in 1997. This was done to promote the album's release. It was the first Collective Soul album to have a vinyl release.

Track listing
All songs by Ed Roland.

Personnel
 Ed Roland – guitar, vocals, producer
 Shane Evans – drums
 Ross Childress – lead guitar, backing vocals
 Dean Roland – guitar
 Will Turpin – bass, backing vocals

Charts

Weekly charts

Year-end charts

References

1997 albums
Albums produced by Ed Roland
Atlantic Records albums
Collective Soul albums